Munaderahu is an island belonging to the country of Estonia. It lies approximately 200m off the coast of Saaremaa and close to the village of Siiksaare. The island has a rocky topography and belongs to the Laidevahe Nature Reserve.

See also
 List of islands of Estonia

References

Islands of Estonia
Saaremaa Parish